Oleksandr Ivanovych Kuzmuk (born 17 April 1954) is a Ukrainian politician and military commander, who is member of the Party of Regions and was Minister of Defence of Ukraine on two occasions, from 1996 to 2001 and from 2004 to 2005. Kuzmuk formerly commanded the National Guard of Ukraine (1995–1996) and holds the highest rank in the Ukrainian military, General of the Army of Ukraine (1998).

Early life and career
Oleksandr Ivanovych Kuzmuk was born on 17 April 1954 into the family of military officer Ivan Fedorovych Kuzmuk (died 1973) and Rayisa Mykhailivna Kuzmuk, in the village of Diatylivka, in the Slavuta Raion of Khmelnytskyi Oblast. In 1975, he graduated the Kharkiv Higher Armor Command College.

Soviet military career 
From 1975 to 1980, Kuzmuk served as platoon leader of armour forces, and became deputy chief of staff of his armour regiment. From 1980 to 1983, he was an audit student of the Malinovsky Military Armored Forces Academy, in Moscow. After that, until 1988 Kuzmuk was an instructor at the academy.

From 1988 to 1993, he was in leading positions of mechanized rifle division. From 1975 to 1993, Kuzmuk served in the Group of Soviet Forces in Germany, and the Belorussian, Moscow, Leningrad, Carpathian, and Odessa Military Districts. From 1993 to 1995, he was commander of the 32nd Army Corps and senior military chief of Crimea.

Career in independent Ukraine 
From 1995 to 1996, Kuzmuk was commander of the National Guard of Ukraine and was appointed Minister of Defence. In late 2001, he finished his military career and became a politician by participating in the 2002 Ukrainian parliamentary election on the party list of the For United Ukraine! alliance. Soon after winning multiple seats in the Verkhovna Rada, however, the alliance collapsed, and Kuzmuk stayed with the Labour Ukraine party, an off-shot of the Labour Party of Ukraine. During that time in 2004, he was again appointed the Minister of Defence, while keeping his parliamentary seat. After the Orange Revolution, Kuzmuk lost his ministerial seat, and was replaced by Anatoliy Hrytsenko.

In the 2012 Ukrainian parliamentary election, Kuzmuk was elected into the Verkhovna Rada as a member of Party of Regions.

In the 2014 parliamentary election, Kuzmuk tried to win a seat through winning electoral district 38 situated in Novomoskovsk, but failed, finishing in third place with 12.78% of the vote. The announcement of the final result for electoral district 38 (won by Vadym Nesterenko) was delayed until mid-November because Kuzmuk challenged the results in court, claiming Nesterenko was guilty of fraud and bribery of voters.

Awards and decorations
Kuzmuk has been awarded the following awards and decorations:
Award of the Ministry of Defense of Ukraine for "Valor and Honor"
Honorary pistol
Order of Bohdan Khmelnytsky, 1st Class
Order of Bohdan Khmelnytsky, 2nd Class
Order of Bohdan Khmelnytsky, 3rd Class
Order of Danylo Halytsky
Order of Merit, 3rd Class

References

External links
 Unknown kidnapped a Colonel General in Crimea. Espreso. 5 March 2014
 Leadership of the State Border Guard Service of Ukraine
 Commanders of the National Guard of Ukraine. National Guard of Ukraine website.

Generals of the Army (Ukraine)
Living people
1954 births
People from Khmelnytskyi Oblast
Defence ministers of Ukraine
Vice Prime Ministers of Ukraine
Ivan Chernyakhovsky National Defense University of Ukraine alumni
Frunze Military Academy alumni
Party of Regions politicians
Recipients of the Order of Merit (Ukraine), 3rd class
Recipients of the Order of Bohdan Khmelnytsky, 1st class
Recipients of the Order of Bohdan Khmelnytsky, 2nd class
Recipients of the Order of Bohdan Khmelnytsky, 3rd class
Recipients of the Order of Danylo Halytsky
Laureates of the State Prize of Ukraine in Science and Technology